The 1967 British Sports Car Championship was the fourth season of the British Sports Car Championship.

Results
Races in bold, when also rounds of the World Championship for Makes.

References

British Sports Car Championship
Sports Car